Henrey is a surname. Notable people with the surname include: 

Blanche Henrey (1906–1983), English botanical writer and bibliographer
Bobby Henrey (born 1939), Anglo-French actor 
Madeleine Henrey (1906–2004), French-born writer

Other uses
Henrey Automobile, a Chinese electric automaker

See also
Henry (surname)